GATT or the General Agreement on Tariffs and Trade is a legal agreement between many countries, whose overall purpose was to promote international trade.

Gatt or GATT may also refer to:
 Gatt (surname)
 Gatt Gatt the Bat, a nickname given to Mike Gatting, an English cricketer
 Generic Attribute Profile, a data exchange protocol in Bluetooth Low Energy